is a Japanese ski jumper. He competed at the 1956 Winter Olympics and the 1960 Winter Olympics.

References

External links
 

1931 births
Possibly living people
Japanese male ski jumpers
Japanese male Nordic combined skiers
Olympic ski jumpers of Japan
Olympic Nordic combined skiers of Japan
Ski jumpers at the 1956 Winter Olympics
Ski jumpers at the 1960 Winter Olympics
Nordic combined skiers at the 1956 Winter Olympics
Sportspeople from Hokkaido